Isaac Walthour (August 25, 1930 – September 10, 1977) was an American former professional basketball player. He played in the National Basketball Association for the Milwaukee Hawks for four games during the 1953–54 season.

References 

1930 births
1977 deaths
American Basketball League (1925–1955) players
American military personnel of the Korean War
Basketball players from New York City
Forwards (basketball)
Milwaukee Hawks players
Undrafted National Basketball Association players
American men's basketball players